The Marine Corps Training and Education Command (TECOM) is the primary training command of the United States Marine Corps.

Commands within TECOM
There are two major commands that fall under TECOM – Training Command and Education Command.

Training Command
Training Command is responsible for the production of officer and enlisted entry-level Military Occupational Specialty, career progression, and career enhancement skills, with control over all formal training schools throughout the Marine Corps, including Officer Candidate School, The Basic School, Schools of Infantry and various other formal schools.

Some of the major units within Training Command are:

Officer Candidates School
The Basic School
Marine Corps Communication-Electronics School
United States Marine Corps Schools of Infantry
Marine Aviation Training Support Group 21
Marine Aviation Training Support Group 22
Marine Aviation Training Support Group 23
Marine Corps Detachment, Fort Leonard Wood
Marine Corps Artillery Detachment, Fort Sill
Marine Corps Intelligence Schools
Marine Corps Engineering School
Marine Corps Combat Service Support Schools
Field Medical Training Battalion - East
Field Medical Training Battalion - West
Weapons Training Battalion
Assault Amphibian School

Education Command
Education Command governs the training plans and policies that are instituted Corps-wide; This is the responsibility of the Policy & Standards Division (PSD) within TECOM HQ . This includes the Marine Corps Institute (MCI) courses and the Command and Staff College.

Some of the major units within Education Command are:
Marine Corps University
Marine Corps Command and Staff College
Marine Corps Historical Division
Marine Corps JROTC - MCJROTC is a special staff section under TECOM Headquarters - not part of EDCOM

Other commands
TECOM supervises several semi-autonomous commands that provide training and education to units in the Marine Corps:

MAGTF Training Command (MAGTF-TC) aboard Marine Corps Air Ground Combat Center
 Marine Aviation Weapons and Tactics Squadron One (MAWTS-1) conducts training for aviation units, most notably the Weapons and Tactics Instructor (WTI) course at Marine Corps Air Station Yuma.
 Mountain Warfare Training Center trains air and ground units for warfare in mountainous, high-altitude, and cold weather environments.
 The Tactical Training and Exercise Control group (TTECG) conducts several Combined Arms exercises a year called comprehensive, MAGTF-level Integrated Training Exercises (ITX), formerly referred to as [Enhanced] Mojave Viper (EMV) in support of Marine Corps units aboard MAGTFTC Twentynine Palms, California. 
 Marine Corps Tactics and Operations Group (MCTOG) conducts training for battle staff teams of battalions and regiments, most notably the Operations and Tactics Instructor (OTI) Course, where students learn skills in operational management of battle staffs.

Marine Recruit Depot San Diego (MCRD-SD) aboard Marine Recruit Depot San Diego, California

Marine Recruit Depot Parris Island (MCRD-PI) aboard Marine Recruit Depot Parris Island, South Carolina

List of commanders 

 MajGen James W. Lukeman, ~2014
 MajGen Kevin M. Iiams, May 2017
 MajGen William F. Mullen III, 29 June 2018
 LtGen Lewis A. Craparotta, 3 August 2020
 LtGen Kevin M. Iiams, 2 August 2021

See also
U.S. Armed Forces training and education commands
 Army Training and Doctrine Command
 Naval Education and Training Command
 Air Education and Training Command
 Space Training and Readiness Command

References

United States Marine Corps schools
Commands of the United States Marine Corps